The Turkmenistan–Afghanistan–Pakistan–India (TAPI) Pipeline, also known as Trans-Afghanistan Pipeline, is a natural gas pipeline being developed by the Galkynysh – TAPI Pipeline Company Limited with participation of the Asian Development Bank. The pipeline will transport natural gas from the Galkynysh Gas Field in Turkmenistan through Afghanistan into Pakistan and then to India. Construction on the project started in Turkmenistan on 13 December 2015, work on the Afghan section began in February 2018, and work on the Pakistani section was planned to commence in December 2018. The abbreviation TAPI comes from the first letters of those countries. Proponents of the project see it as a modern continuation of the Silk Road.

As of 2022, construction of the pipeline remains stalled.

History

The roots of this project lie in the involvement of international oil companies in Kazakhstan and Turkmenistan beginning of 1990s.  As Russia, who controlled all export pipelines of these countries, consistently refused to allow the use of its pipeline network, these companies needed an independent export route avoiding both Iran and Russia.

The original project started on 15 March 1995 when an inaugural memorandum of understanding between the governments of Turkmenistan and Pakistan for a pipeline project was signed. This project was promoted by Argentinian company Bridas Corporation. The U.S. company Unocal, in conjunction with the Saudi oil company Delta, promoted an alternative project without Bridas' involvement. On 21 October 1995, these two companies signed a separate agreement with Turkmenistan's president Saparmurat Niyazov. In August 1996, the Central Asia Gas Pipeline, Ltd. (CentGas) consortium for construction of a pipeline, led by Unocal, was formed. On 27 October 1997, CentGas was incorporated in formal signing ceremonies in Ashgabat, Turkmenistan, by several international oil companies along with the Government of Turkmenistan.

Since the pipeline was to pass through Afghanistan, it was necessary to work with the Taliban. The U.S. ambassador to Pakistan, Robert Oakley, left his post and was hired by CentGas in 1997. In January 1998, the Taliban, selecting CentGas over Argentinian competitor Bridas Corporation, signed an agreement that allowed the proposed project to proceed. In June 1998, Russian Gazprom relinquished its 10% stake in the project. On 7 August 1998, American embassies in Nairobi and Dar es Salaam were bombed. The United States alleged that Osama bin Laden was behind those attacks, and all pipeline negotiations halted, as the Taliban's then leader, Mullah Omar, announced that bin Laden had the Taliban's support. Unocal withdrew from the consortium on 8 December 1998, and soon after closed its offices in Afghanistan and Pakistan.

After September 11 attacks some people came to believe that a possible motivation for the attacks included justifying the invasions of Afghanistan as well as geostrategic interests such as the Trans-Afghanistan Pipeline project, but this is usually dismissed by analysts as a conspiracy theory.

The new deal on the pipeline was signed on 27 December 2002 by the leaders of Turkmenistan, Afghanistan and Pakistan. In 2005, the Asian Development Bank submitted the final version of a feasibility study designed by British company Penspen. The project has drawn strong US support as it would allow the Central Asian republics to export energy to Western markets "without relying on Russian routes". Then-US Ambassador to Turkmenistan Tracey Ann Jacobson noted, "We are seriously looking at the project, and it is quite possible that American companies will join it". Due to increasing instability, the project has essentially stalled; construction of the Turkmen part was supposed to start in 2006, but the overall feasibility is questionable since the southern part of the Afghan section runs through territory which continues to be under de facto Taliban control.

On 24 April 2008, Pakistan, India and Afghanistan signed a framework agreement to buy natural gas from Turkmenistan. The intergovernmental agreement on the pipeline was signed on 11 December 2010 in Ashgabat. However, in April 2012, India and Afghanistan have failed to agree on transit fee for gas passing through Afghan territory. Consequently, Islamabad and New Delhi too could not agree on the transit fee for the segment of the pipeline passing through Pakistan, which has linked its fee structure to any India-Afghanistan agreement. On 16 May 2012, the Afghan Parliament, approved the agreement on a gas pipeline and the day after, the Indian Cabinet allowed state-run gas-firm GAIL to sign the Gas Sale and Purchase Agreement (GSPA) with Türkmengaz, Turkmenistan's national oil company.

Construction on the project started in Turkmenistan on 13 December 2015 and was completed by mid-2019. Construction on the Afghan side started on 24 February 2018, while construction on the Pakistan side is planned to start by October 2019 and be completed in 2020. The Taliban have vowed to cooperate and not disrupt the project in areas they control.

Technical features
Six compressor stations would be constructed along the pipeline. The pipeline was intended to be operational by 2019.

Originally, the cost of the pipeline project was reportedly estimated at US$7.6 billion, but a more recent estimate was $10 billion. The leading partner of the project is Türkmengaz.

Route
The  pipeline will run from Galkynysh gas fields in Turkmenistan through Afghanistan and Pakistan to India. It starts from the Galkynysh gas field. In Afghanistan, TAPI pipeline will be constructed alongside the Kandahar–Herat Highway in western Afghanistan, and then via Quetta and Multan in Pakistan. The final destination of the pipeline will be the Indian town of Fazilka, near the border between Pakistan and India.

See also

 Afghanistan Oil Pipeline
 Transport in Afghanistan
 Baku-Tbilisi-Ceyhan pipeline (BTC)
 Enron's Dabhol Power Company
 Trans-Caspian Gas Pipeline
 South Caucasus Pipeline
 CentGas
 Port of Chabahar
 Ashgabat agreement

References

Natural gas pipelines in Afghanistan
Natural gas pipelines in Turkmenistan
Natural gas pipelines in Pakistan
Natural gas pipelines in India
Proposed pipelines in Asia
Afghanistan–India relations
Afghanistan–Pakistan relations
Afghanistan–Turkmenistan relations
India–Pakistan relations
Pakistan–Turkmenistan relations
Proposed infrastructure in India